Vicemyia is a genus of wood midges in the family Cecidomyiidae. The one described species - Vicemyia immediata - is only known from Rovno amber from the Late Eocene.

References

Cecidomyiidae genera

Insects described in 2007
Taxa named by Zoya A. Fedotova
Taxa named by Evgeny Perkovsky
Diptera of Europe
Fossil taxa described in 2007
Monotypic Diptera genera